The Steudner's gecko (Tropiocolotes nubicus) is a species of gecko of the genus Tropiocolotes. It is found in Egypt and Sudan. The specific epithet nubicus relates to the type locality, the Nubia Region. 'Steudner' may relate to the German botanist and explorer Hermann Steudner (1832-1863).

References

nubicus
Reptiles described in 1999
Reptiles of North Africa